The Oregon–Oregon State rivalry  (otherwise known as the Civil War) is a college rivalry between the University of Oregon and Oregon State University. The rivalry is one of the oldest in the nation, dating back to 1894 when the two universities' football teams first met. Although the college football game is the most popular rivalry, the two universities have noted rivalry games in every sport that both sponsor. There is also an academic rivalry between the schools on occasion, and competitions for community services such as blood drives take place often.

All-time records
Although determining the overall series winner is a fairly recent practice, all-time records for sports between the universities have been kept since play started.

Men's sports

Baseball
 The 2005 and 2006 seasons saw a rare unity between the schools in rooting for the Oregon State baseball team during the 2005 and 2006 College World Series. The Beavers went two-and-out (i.e., lost their first two games in the double-elimination event) in 2005, but won the national title in 2006 and 2007. With the recent success of the Oregon State Baseball program, the University of Oregon reinstated their baseball program in 2009.

Basketball
The men's basketball rivalry is one of the most contested games between any two teams in the nation, with an NCAA record 362 games played as of the December 31, 2022.  The Beavers also hold the NCAA record for the third most wins against a single team (the Ducks) with the series' 193–169 record.

Football

The football rivalry is the seventh longest running rivalry in the United States, being first contested in 1894. The Ducks lead the overall series at 66–48–10 as of the end of the 2020 season.

Soccer
The men's soccer teams have only played 3 times, with the Ducks dropping this as a sport at the conclusion of the 1989 season.  The Beavers won all three contests played, leaving the record at 3–0–0 in favor of OSU.

Wrestling
Oregon State has traditionally dominated in this sport, leading the Ducks 103–24–4 in the all-time series as of the end of the 2005–06 season. Oregon State has won the past 7 meets, dating back to the 2003 season. The Ducks have dropped this sport and it has been absent for several years.

Women's sports

Basketball
The all-time record between the women's basketball teams as of the teams' two regularly scheduled games in 2019–20 is 63–41 in favor of Oregon.

Soccer
The all-time record in women's soccer is even at 10–10–4 as of the end of the 2019 season.

Softball
Oregon State holds the all-time series in softball at 79–78–1, as of 2009.

Volleyball
Oregon leads the all-time series with Oregon State 78–44–1 as of the end of the 2019 season.

See also
 PacificSource Civil War Series
 Oregon–Oregon State football rivalry

References 

Oregon State Beavers
Oregon Ducks
College sports rivalries in the United States
College sports in Oregon
Sports competitions in Oregon
1894 establishments in Oregon